Feliciano Brizuela Baez (born 17 July 1996) is a Paraguayan footballer who plays as a right winger for Guaireña, on loan from Club Olimpia.

Club career

3 de Febrero
Throughout the 2018 season, Brizuela played 41 of 44 matches and went on to score six goals for 3 de Febrero.

On 8 February 2019 it was confirmed, that he had been loaned out to Brazilian Campeonato Brasileiro Série A club Avaí FC for the 2019 season. Brizuela helped Avaí winning the Campeonato Catarinense, playing 10 games, 6 from start and 4 as a substitute, and also scored two goals. He also played four games in the Campeonato Brasileiro Série A and one game in the Copa do Brasil. Brizuela returned to 3 de Febrero in November 2019.

Olimpia
In January 2020, Brizuela signed for Club Olimpia and was immediately loaned out to Club Sportivo San Lorenzo. He got his debut for San Lorenzo on 17 January 2020 against Club Guaraní. Brizuela made 24 appearances for the club and scored one goal, before returning to Olimpia.

In January 2021, he was loaned out again, this time to Guaireña F.C. for the 2021 season. After a season with three goals in 27 games, Brizuela returned to Olimpia in January 2022.

After returning to Olimpia for the 2022 season, he got his official debut for the club on 5 February 2022 against General Caballero JLM. However, in July 2022, Brizuela was sent out on a new loan spell; the attacker returned to Guaireña on a loan for the rest of the year.

References

External links
 

Living people
1996 births
Association football wingers
Paraguayan footballers
Paraguayan expatriate footballers
Paraguayan Primera División players
Campeonato Brasileiro Série A players
Club Atlético 3 de Febrero players
Avaí FC players
Club Olimpia footballers
Club Sportivo San Lorenzo footballers
Paraguayan expatriate sportspeople in Brazil
Expatriate footballers in Brazil